Tekie Abraha is an Eritrean professional football manager.

Career
Since 1992 to 1994, 2001 to 2003 he coached the Eritrea national football team.

References

External links

Year of birth missing (living people)
Living people
Eritrean football managers
Eritrea national football team managers